Thingoe was a hundred of Suffolk, consisting of .

The remainder of the hundred consisted of the land to the west of Bury St Edmunds. The River Lark rises in the hundred, flowing north to the River Little Ouse.

The name derives from the words thing, a Norse word meaning "assembly", and howe, again Norse, meaning detached hill or mound.

Parishes

Thingoe Hundred consisted of the following 18 parishes:

References

Hundreds of Suffolk